

Honours
Ukrainian Women's League
 Winners (6):  2000, 2001, 2002, 2005, 2009, 2010
 Runners-up (10): 1997, 1998, 1999, 2003, 2004, 2006, 2008, 2011, 2013, 2015
 Third place (6):: 1992, 2007, 2014, 2016, 2017–18

Women's Cup
 Winners (4):  2001, 2002, 2005, 2009
 Runners-up (14): 1998, 1999, 2003, 2004, 2006, 2007, 2008, 2010, 2011, 2013, 2014, 2015, 2016, 2017–18

Winter Championship
 Winners (1):  2013
 Runners-up (2): 2008, 2018

Italy Women's Cup:
 Winners (1):  2006
 Third place (1):: 2005

European history

References